Codename Coq Rouge is a 1989 Swedish thriller film directed by Per Berglund. Stellan Skarsgård won the award for Best Actor and Göran Nilsson won the award for Best Cinematography at the 25th Guldbagge Awards.

Cast
 Stellan Skarsgård as Carl Hamilton
 Lennart Hjulström as Näslund
 Krister Henriksson as Fristedt
 Philip Zandén as Appeltoft
 Bengt Eklund as Den gamle
 Lars Green as Ponti
 Roland Hedlund as Folkesson
 Anette Kischinowsky as Fatumeh
 Nick Burnell as Meyer
 Harald Hamrell as Johansson
 Tjadden Hällström as Ljungdahl (as Lars 'Tjadden' Hällström)
 Tove Granditsky as Shulamit Hanegbi (as Tove Granditsky-Svenson)
 Lena T. Hansson as Eva Hamilton
 Gustaf Skarsgård as Erik Hamilton

References

External links
 
 

1989 films
1989 thriller films
Swedish thriller films
1980s Swedish-language films
1980s Swedish films